Democratic Action for Namas was a political party in Namibia with ethnic affiliation to the Nama people. The chairman was Willem Oasib Boois. It was founded on 20 November 1984. It was one of the parties that merged into the Federal Convention of Namibia in 1988.

References

Defunct political parties in Namibia
Political parties established in 1984
Political parties disestablished in 1988
1984 establishments in South West Africa
1988 disestablishments in South West Africa
Nama people